Winona Winter (1889 — April 27, 1940) was an American vaudeville performer and silent-film actress.

Early life
Winona Winter was the daughter of minstrel songwriter William Banks Winter and Clara Demming Newman Winter. She had two younger brothers. Winter acted as a child, in The Little Tycoon (1895) in Detroit. In 1901, her skull was examined by phrenologists in a published case study, which found her to be gifted, especially in humor and memory.

Career
In vaudeville Winter was best known for "soubrette" parts, as a singing comedian, and as a ventriloquist. She performed with Will Rogers in Rochester in 1908, in New York in 1910, and in Chicago in 1912, and was associated with Harry Lauder's company in 1922. She was still performing on vaudeville in 1928, with an act she called "Broadway-o-grams", a selection of short character sketches and celebrity impersonations.

Winter appeared in four Broadway musical productions: The Little Cherub (1906-1907), He Came from Milwaukee (1910), The Fascinating Widow (1911), and The Broadway Whirl (also called The Century Midnight Whirl) (1921).  

She played "Sally" in the silent film The Man from Mexico (1914).

Personal life
Winter married Norman L. Sper, a sports announcer. They had a son, Norman L. Sper Jr., born in 1925. 

In 1940, Winter died in Los Angeles, California. Winter was 51. Winter is buried in Hollywood Forever Cemetery in California.

References

External links
 
 Winona Winter's listing on IBDB.
 Winona Winter's gravesite on Find a Grave.

1889 births
1940 deaths
American actresses
Vaudeville performers
Ventriloquists